Vladimir Senin (September 17, 1960, Moscow) is a Russian political figure and deputy of the 8th State Duma. In 2005, he was granted a Candidate of Sciences Degree in Juridical Science. 

From 1991 to 1993, Senin held high-ranking positions in the system of executive power of Moscow. In 1994-1995, he was the head of the analytical sector of the State Duma apparatus. From 1996 to 2002, he was the deputy head of the Department of Affairs of the Office of the Federation Council. From 2003 to 2005, Senin worked as deputy head of the Department for Relations with Government Authorities of Alfa-Bank. In 2005-2011, he was appointed senior vice president of the Alfa-Bank. Since September 2021, he has served as deputy of the 8th State Duma.

He is one of the members of the State Duma the United States Treasury sanctioned on 24 March 2022 in response to the 2022 Russian invasion of Ukraine.

References

1960 births
Living people
United Russia politicians
21st-century Russian politicians
Eighth convocation members of the State Duma (Russian Federation)
Russian individuals subject to the U.S. Department of the Treasury sanctions